Morocco  is a 1930 American pre-Code romantic drama film directed by Josef von Sternberg and starring Gary Cooper, Marlene Dietrich, and Adolphe Menjou. Based on the 1927 novel Amy Jolly (the on-screen credits state: from the play 'Amy Jolly') by Benno Vigny and adapted by Jules Furthman, the film is about a cabaret singer and a Legionnaire who fall in love during the Rif War, and whose relationship is complicated by his womanizing and the appearance of a rich man who is also in love with her. The film is famous for a scene in which Dietrich performs a song dressed in a man's tailcoat and kisses another woman (to the embarrassment of the latter), both of which were considered scandalous for the period.

Dietrich was nominated for the Academy Award for Best Actress in a Leading Role, von Sternberg for Best Director, Hans Dreier for Best Art Direction, and Lee Garmes for Best Cinematography. In 1992, Morocco was selected for preservation in the United States National Film Registry by the Library of Congress as being "culturally, historically, or aesthetically significant".

Plot
In Mogador, Morocco in the late 1920s, a unit of the French Foreign Legion returns from a campaign. Among the legionnaires is Private Tom Brown. Meanwhile, on a ship bound for Mogador is the disillusioned nightclub singer Amy Jolly. Wealthy La Bessière tries to make her acquaintance, but she rebuffs him.

Amy becomes the headliner at a nightclub. After a performance, she sells apples to members of the audience, including La Bessière and Brown. When Amy gives the latter his "change", she slips him her key.

On the way to Amy's house, Tom encounters Adjudant Caesar's wife. She clearly has a clandestine relationship with him, which she desires to maintain, but Tom rejects her. He enters Amy's house and he and Amy become acquainted. She is embittered with life and men after repeated betrayals, and asks if Tom can restore her faith in men. He answers that he is the wrong man for that. Unwilling to risk heartbreak yet again, she asks him to leave before anything serious happens.

Back in the street, Tom encounters Caesar's wife again, while her husband watches undetected from the shadows. Meanwhile, Amy changes her mind and comes after Tom, who heads back with her to her house. Madame Caesar hires two ruffians to attack Tom, but he manages to seriously wound both.

The next day, Tom is brought before Caesar, who is Tom's commanding officer, for injuring the two natives. Amy helps Tom's case by testifying that he was attacked, but Caesar makes Tom aware that he knows about Tom's involvement with his wife. La Bessière, whose affections for Amy continue unabated, knows of her feelings for Tom and offers to use his influence to lighten Tom's punishment. Instead of a court-martial, Tom is reassigned to a detachment commanded by Caesar that is leaving soon for Amalfa Pass. Suspecting that Caesar intends to rid himself of his romantic rival while they are gone, Tom decides to desert and run away with Amy.

Tom goes to Amy's nightclub dressing room. He overhears La Bessière offer to marry Amy, and her politely reject the proposal, before knocking on the door. La Bessière leaves Amy alone with Tom, who tells her that, if she will join him, he will desert and board a freighter to Europe. She agrees to go along and asks Tom to wait while she performs. Once he is alone, he notices a lavish bracelet that La Bessière has given to Amy. Though he has fallen in love with her, Tom decides Amy would be better off with a rich man than with a poor Legionnaire. He writes on the mirror, "I changed my mind. Good luck!" and leaves.

In the morning, Amy arrives in the town square with La Bessière so she can bid Tom farewell. She asks La Bessière about some women following the company, remarking that the women must be mad. La Bessière responds, "I don't know. You see, they love their men."

On the way to Amalfa Pass, Tom's detachment runs into a machine-gun nest. Caesar orders Tom to deal with it, and Tom suspects it is a suicide mission. To his surprise, Caesar decides to accompany him. After drawing his pistol (apparently to kill Tom), Caesar is shot and killed by the enemy.

Back in Mogador, Amy accepts La Bessière's marriage proposal and tries to make herself love him, but she still pines for Tom. At an engagement party, she hears the return of what is left of Tom's detachment. She leaves the party and is told Tom was wounded and left behind to recuperate in a hospital. She informs La Bessière that she must go to Tom, and, wanting only her happiness, he drives her to the hospital. It turns out Tom had been faking an injury to avoid combat and, when this was discovered, he was assigned to a new unit in the Legion. Amy goes to a bar where Tom was, briefly talks with him, and when he leaves, finds that he has carved into the table the name Amy, showing that he still loves her, which surprises her.

The next morning, Amy and La Bessière watch Tom's new unit march away. She catches Tom's eye and the two wave goodbye. When Amy sees the handful of women following the legionnaires they love, she leaves La Bessière, kicks off her high-heeled shoes, and follows Tom into the desert.

Cast

 Gary Cooper as Légionnaire Tom Brown
 Marlene Dietrich as Mademoiselle Amy Jolly
 Adolphe Menjou as Monsieur La Bessière
 Ullrich Haupt as Adjutant Caesar
 Eve Southern as Madame Caesar
 Francis McDonald as Sergeant Tatoche
 Paul Porcasi as Lo Tinto

Uncredited (in order of appearance)
 Albert Conti as Colonel Quinnovieres
 Thomas A. Curran as a nightclub patron
 Émile Chautard as French General
 Michael Visaroff as Colonel Alexandre Barratière
 Juliette Compton as Anna Dolores, a woman who clings to Tom
 Theresa Harris as a camp follower

Background
Even before Josef von Sternberg's The Blue Angel was released to international acclaim in 1930, Paramount Pictures took a keen interest in its new star, Marlene Dietrich. When the Berlin production was completed in January, Sternberg departed Germany before its premiere on April 1, confident his work would be a success. Legend has it that Dietrich included a copy of author Benno Vigny's story Amy Jolly in a going-away gift package to Sternberg when he sailed for America. He and screenwriter Jules Furthman would write a script for Morocco based on the Vigny story.

On the basis of test footage Sternberg provided from the yet unreleased The Blue Angel, producer B. P. Schulberg agreed to bring Dietrich to Hollywood in February 1930 under a two-picture contract. When she arrived in the United States, Sternberg welcomed her with gifts, including a green Rolls-Royce Phantom II, which featured in some scenes of Morocco.

Dietrich "was subjected to the full power of Paramount's public relations machine", launching her into "international stardom" before American moviegoers had seen her as Lola Lola in The Blue Angel, which appeared in U.S. theaters in 1931.

Production
The character of Amy was toned down considerably from the novel. As in the book, in the film the name aimee jolie (French for "beloved and pretty") is meant ironically as Amy is portrayed as a fallen star past her prime, a desperately lonely woman lost in despair who has gone to Morocco to die. However, in the book, the character of Amy was a prostitute and a drug addict, both of which were unacceptable even under the looser censorship in 1930 Hollywood and these aspects of Amy's character were removed from the film during the script-writing. Likewise, the ending was changed from the book to the film. In the book, Amy abandons Tom and at the conclusion of the novel, boards a ship to Buenos Aires. Sternberg disliked the ending in the book, and gave the film the more romantic ending where Amy chooses to be with Brown by going with him into the Sahara.  

Sternberg's depiction of "picturesque" Morocco elicited a favorable response from the Moroccan government, which ran announcements in The New York Times inviting American tourists to enjoy the country "just as Gary Cooper [was seduced by the] unforgettable landscapes and engaging people." However, the film was filmed entirely in southern California, and Sternberg felt compelled to personally reassure the Pasha of Marrakesh that Morocco had not been shot in his domain.

Cinematographer Lee Garmes and Sternberg (himself a skilled camera technician) developed the distinctive lighting methods that served to enhance Dietrich's best facial features, while obscuring her slightly bulbous nose.

According to Robert Osborne of Turner Classic Movies, Cooper and Sternberg did not get along. Sternberg filmed so as to make Cooper look up at Dietrich, emphasizing her at his expense. Cooper complained to his studio bosses and got it stopped. Cooper greatly disliked Sternberg, complaining that he received little in the way of direction from him about how to play Brown. It was open knowledge on the set that Sternberg and Dietrich were lovers, and Cooper felt that he was very much a secondary figure in the film as Sternberg devoted all of his attention to Dietrich. As a way of compensation, Cooper brought his mistress, the Mexican actress Lupe Vélez onto the set and went out of his way to demonstratively show his affections by having her sit on his lap between takes and passionately kissing her as often as possible.

Shooting for Morocco was completed in August 1930.

The final scene of Morocco is recreated in the 1946 Mexican film Enamorada, directed by Emilio Fernández.

Home media 
Morocco was released by Universal Studios in DVD on April 25, 2011 under label Universal Vault Series.

Reception
Premiering in New York City on December 6, 1930, Moroccos success at the box office was "immediate and impressive".

Accolades for the film were issued by Soviet director Sergei Eisenstein, screenwriter Robert E. Sherwood, and filmmaker Charles Chaplin, who said of the film, "yes, [Sternberg] is an artist ... it is his best film [to date]." 

In a contemporary review, the French critic Michel Vauclaire wrote: "Every year in the US, half a dozen novels are published about the Legion, in general very severe and quite fantastic. It's obviously on this sort of fiction that Sternberg has based his research. Perhaps the film reflects the American public's idea of the Legionaries. In France, despite its dramatic pretensions, it will raise a laugh".

The film garnered Academy Award nominations for Best Director (Sternberg), Best Actress (Dietrich), Best Art Direction (Hans Dreier), and Best Cinematography (Lee Garmes), though it did not win any awards.</ref>

Titled The Legionnaire and the Lady,  Marlene Dietrich and Clark Gable performed the story on radio as the first Lux Radio Theatre broadcast on June 1, 1936.

The Japanese filmmaker Akira Kurosawa cited this movie as one of his 100 favorite films.

Critical response 

Charles Silver, curator at the Museum of Modern Art's Department of Film, offers this assessment of Morocco:

Theme

With Morocco, Sternberg examines the "interchange of masculine and feminine characteristics" in a "genuine interplay between male and female."

Tom Brown
The character of Tom Brown was portrayed as an example of a lost soul, a tough, jaded American serving in the French Foreign Legion with a name that was so bland that it was clearly a pseudonym. In the film, it is strongly implied that Brown was attempting to escape a painful past by enlisting in the French Foreign Legion, which famously "asks no questions" about an applicant's background. Likewise, Brown seems to have no future beyond fighting for a cause that he does not believe in Morocco and seemingly sleeping with every women in sight. It is only when he meets Amy that he finds someone that he actually cares about and a reason to be hopeful about the future. Most notably, Brown who was portrayed as an entirely cynical, selfish character prior to meeting Amy displays an altruistic side as he encourages Amy to marry the rich man La Bessière who is more capable of supporting her financially than he is under his private's salary.

"When Love Dies": Dietrich's male impersonation
Dietrich's "butch performance" dressed in "top hat, white tie and tails" includes a "mock seduction" of a pretty female cabaret patron, whom Dietrich "outrages with a kiss." Dietrich's costume simultaneously mocks the pretensions of one lover (Menjou's La Bessière) and serves as an invitation to a handsome soldier-of-fortune (Cooper's Tom Brown), the two men being presented by Sternberg as contrasting conceptions of masculinity."

This famous sequence provides an insight into Dietrich's character, Amy Jolly, as well as the director himself: "Dietrich's impersonation is an adventure, an act of bravado that subtly alters her conception of herself as a woman, and what begins as self-expression ends in self-sacrifice, perhaps the path also of Sternberg as an artist."

La Bessière's humiliation
Dietrich's devoted suitor, Menjou's La Bessière, "part stoic, part sybarite, part satanist", is destined to lose the object of his desire. Menjou's response to Dietrich's desertion reveals the nature of the man and presents a key thematic element of the film:

In Menjou's pained politeness of expression is engraved the age-old tension between Apollonian and Dionysian demands of art, between pride in restraint and passion in excess ... when Dietrich kisses him goodbye, Menjou clutches her wrist in one last spasmodic reflex of passion, but the other hand retains its poise at his side, the gestures of form and feeling thus conflicting to the very end of the drama.

The La Bessière character has autobiographical overtones for Sternberg, as Menjou has looks and mannerisms that resemble the director. Critic Andrew Sarris observed: "Sternberg has never been as close to any character as he is to this elegant expatriate."

Dietrich's high-heeled march into the dunes
The "absurdity" of the closing sequence, in which Dietrich, "sets out into the desert sands on spike heels in search of Gary Cooper", was noted by critics at the time of the film's release. The image, however odd, is part of the "dream décor" that abandoned "documentary certification" to create "a world of illusions." As Sarris points out, "The complaint that a woman in high heels would not walk off into the desert is nonetheless meaningless. A dream does not require endurance, only the will to act."

Film historian Charles Silver considers the final scene as one that "no artist today would dare attempt":

Accolades

The film was ranked 83rd on the American Film Institute's 2002 list AFI's 100 Years...100 Passions.

References

Bibliography

External links

 
 
 
 
 Morocco at Virtual History
 The Legionnaire and the Lady on Lux Radio Theater: June 1, 1936. Radio adaptation of Morocco starring Clark Gable and Marlene Dietrich.
 Morocco at filmsufi
 Morocco essay by Daniel Eagan in America's Film Legacy: The Authoritative Guide to the Landmark Movies in the National Film Registry, A&C Black, 2010 , pages 173-175 

1930 films
1930 romantic drama films
1930s American films
1930s English-language films
1930s LGBT-related films
American black-and-white films
American LGBT-related films
American romantic drama films
Films about the French Foreign Legion
Films directed by Josef von Sternberg
Films scored by Karl Hajos
Films set in the 1920s
Films set in deserts
Films set in Morocco
Films with screenplays by Jules Furthman
LGBT-related romantic drama films
Paramount Pictures films
United States National Film Registry films